Emmett J. Conrad High School is a public high school located in Vickery Meadow, Dallas, Texas. Emmett J. Conrad High School, which covers grades 9-12, is a part of the Dallas Independent School District. The school serves most of Vickery Meadow and the DISD portion of Highland Meadows. It is named for Dallas surgeon and civic leader Emmett James Conrad. In 2015, the school was rated "Met Standard" by the Texas Education Agency.

History

The district projected that Conrad would have a higher enrollment. But by 2012 the enrollment was lower than expected as several area apartment complexes had been razed. In 2015 its student body was 66% of the school's official capacity.

Features

Built in 2006 for $42.3 million, the school was designed to hold 2,000 students. The  building features 46 core classrooms on 40 acres, including classrooms for performing arts, visual arts, media, science, and instructional technology. The campus has student dining areas and athletic fields.

Athletics
The Emmett J. Conrad Chargers compete in UIL district 11-5A in the following sports:

Baseball
Basketball
Cross Country
Football
Golf
Soccer
Softball
Swimming and Diving
Tennis
Track and Field
Volleyball
Wrestling

To date, under the leadership of Athletic Coordinator M.T. Tyeskie, Conrad High School has had 39 students receive athletic scholarships. Conrad has competed in five UIL state tournaments (cross country 2016 and 2017, wrestling 2014 and 2018, and track and field 2018).

Conrad now has the distinction of being the expense of Diamond Hill-Jarvis High School ending their 77-game losing streak, the 2nd longest in Texas High School Football history.

Swimming
Small in size by 5A standards, the Conrad swimming and diving team found some success starting in the 2016-2017 season. Previously coached by Joanna McDowell in 2017, the team earned 3rd place at District UIL competition and won at other various meets.

Robotics 
Conrad has offered robotics programs open to all students to apply since 2009. The program is centered around FIRST Robotics Competition team FRC3005. The RoboChargers is a year round program which meets outside of school hours. The RoboChargers, founded in 2009, have won numerous awards in recent years, including their first "blue banner" event win at the Colorado Regional in 2018.

The RoboChargers have competed in the UIL State Robotics tournament since its initial year of creation in 2016. Competing in the FIRST (FRC) Division in 2016, 2017, 2018 and 2019 and winning runner-up in 2018 with partners FRC148 and FRC4639.

There are also four FIRST Tech Challenge teams, founded in 2017, that are part of the program.

The RoboCharger teams are supported and mentored by professionals from companies including Texas Instruments, Safeco, Boeing, and Exxon.

Feeder patterns 
As of the 2022-2023 school year, L. L. Hotchkiss, Jack Lowe Sr., Lee McShan Jr., Highland Meadows, and Jill Stone Elementary Schools feed into Tasby Middle School and then Conrad High School.

References

External links 

 
 Dallas ISD listing for Emmett J. Conrad (Archive)
 Conrad High School's FIRST Robotics Team

Dallas Independent School District high schools
Public high schools in Dallas
Educational institutions established in 2006
2006 establishments in Texas